Trevor Knight is an Australian musician. Together with Smoky Dawson he was nominated for a 1989 ARIA Award for Best Country Album for their single "High Country". The pair also won Golden Guitars in 1988 for "Days Of Old Khancoban" and 1989 for "High Country".

Discography

Albums

Awards

ARIA Music Awards
The ARIA Music Awards are a set of annual ceremonies presented by Australian Recording Industry Association (ARIA), which recognise excellence, innovation, and achievement across all genres of the music of Australia. They commenced in 1987. 

! 
|-
| 1989 || High Country (with Smokey Dawson) || ARIA Award for Best Country Album ||  ||

Country Music Awards of Australia
The Country Music Awards of Australia (CMAA) (also known as the Golden Guitar Awards) is an annual awards night held in January during the Tamworth Country Music Festival, celebrating recording excellence in the Australian country music industry. They have been held annually since 1973.

|-
| 1988
| "The Days Of Old Khancoban" Smoky Dawson & Trevor Knight's Newport Trio
| Heritage Award
| 
|-
| 1989
| "High Country" Smoky Dawson & Trevor Knight
| Vocal Group or Duo of the Year
| 

 Note: wins only

References

External links
Trevor Knight

Australian male singers
Living people
Year of birth missing (living people)